The Great Lakes Commission is a United States interstate agency established in 1955 through the Great Lakes Basin Compact, in order to "promote the orderly, integrated and comprehensive development, use and conservation of the water resources of the Great Lakes Basin," which includes the Saint Lawrence River. The Great Lakes Commission provides policy development, coordination, and advocacy on issues of regional concern, as well as communication and research services.

The eight member states are Illinois, Indiana, Michigan, Minnesota, New York, Ohio, Pennsylvania, and Wisconsin.
The Canadian provinces of Ontario and Quebec are associate members. 
Each state has three votes on matters coming before the commission, while associate members and observers (representing the United States and Canadian federal governments, tribes, and other regional organizations) are permitted to participate in discussions, deliberations and other activities as approved by the Commission but have no vote. 

There is a separate and distinct entity with a similar brief, the International Joint Commission, which exists between the federal levels of the United States and Canada.

See also
Great Lakes and St. Lawrence Governors and Premiers
Great Lakes
Great Lakes Basin
Great Lakes Compact
Great Lakes–Saint Lawrence River Basin Sustainable Water Resources Agreement
Great Lakes Circle Tour
International Joint Commission

References

External links

United States interstate agencies
Great Lakes
Illinois law
Indiana law
Michigan law
Pennsylvania law
Wisconsin law
New York (state) law
Ohio law
Minnesota law
Water law in the United States
Water management authorities in the United States
Environmental agencies in the United States
Environmental agencies in New York (state)